Telegram is the debut EP by Australian singer-songwriter Kate Miller-Heidke. It was released independently on 14 July 2004. Miller-Heidke signed to Sony in 2006 and the song "Space They Cannot Touch" was re-recorded for inclusion on her debut studio album Little Eve (2007).

Track listing

Release history

References

2004 EPs
EPs by Australian artists
Kate Miller-Heidke albums
Self-released EPs